Interspirituality, also known as interspiritual, is an interfaith concept where a diversity of spiritual practices are embraced for common respect for the individual and shared aspects across a variety of spiritual paths.

History 

Interspirituality comes from the work of Wayne Teasdale,  who developed this term to reflect commonalities between religious traditions, specifically those that are spiritual in nature. These commonalities across religious practices do not erase differences in beliefs, rather they build community and sharing across practices, leading to the ultimate goal of more human responsibility to one another and the planet as a whole. At its core, this is an "assimilation of insights, values, and spiritual practices" drawn from many different traditions that can be applied to one's own life to further personal, spiritual development.

Critique 
While interspirituality is involved with common spiritual practices that, these are not synonymous with how religious traditions practice. As such, interspirituality should not be considered synonymous with interfaith work, in part because some spiritual practices may be considered antithetic to certain religious practice, thereby including elements that would not be accepted by some conservative approaches. The new insights that can be gained through aspects of other spiritual practices can be threatening to some faiths, as postmodern approaches to beliefs and practices can be challenging when individuals are encouraged to explore other practices to deepen one's own.

Interspiritual Meditation 
One way interspirituality is practiced is through interspiritual meditation. This originally developed from the Snowmass Conferences convened by Thomas Keating, who organized gatherings of people from other spiritual practices, including the Dalai Lama. Through these gatherings, interspiritual meditation grew to incorporate insights in meditative and contemplative practices across many spiritual traditions, primarily through engaging in shared spiritual practices and then discussing them, rather than through lectures or formal teachings about them. These practices continued to develop and expand beyond Keating's death.

See also  

 Interfaith

Spirituality
Wayne Teasdale

References 

Spirituality
Interfaith dialogue